Landau Forte Academy Tamworth Sixth Form is a Sixth form centre and academy situated in Tamworth, Staffordshire, England.

History
The Sixth form was founded in November 2011 and was converted to an academy on 1 August 2013 by the Landau Forte Charitable Trust. The trust has opened several schools in the area, such as Landau Forte Academy QEMS and Landau Forte Academy Amington.

An Ofsted report in April 2015 said that the Sixth form 'requires improvement'. In September 2018, the most recent Ofsted inspection rated the Sixth Form as 'Good'.

References

External links
 Official website

Academies in Staffordshire
Schools in Tamworth, Staffordshire
Sixth form colleges in Staffordshire